Sanford Jackson was a Canadian biochemist.

Jackson graduated from the University of Toronto in chemical engineering and pathological chemistry.  He was research biochemist and biochemist-in-chief at the Toronto Hospital for Sick Children 1937–1974.

Jackson was a founding member of the Canadian Society of Clinical Chemists and the Ontario Society of Clinical Chemists.  He invented the bilirubinometer, which allowed more accurate measurement of serum bilirubin in infants and children.

Jackson died 4 September 2000 at age 91.

References

External links
Professor Emeritus Sanford Jackson

Year of birth missing
Canadian biochemists
University of Toronto alumni
Academic staff of the University of Toronto